Ibsen Dana Elcar (October 10, 1927 – June 6, 2005) was an American television and film character actor. He appeared in about 40 films as well as in the 1960s television series Dark Shadows as Sheriff George Patterson and the 1980s and 1990s television series MacGyver as Peter Thornton, MacGyver's immediate supervisor at the Phoenix Foundation. Elcar had appeared in the pilot episode of MacGyver as Andy Colson before assuming the role of Thornton.

Early life
Elcar was born in Ferndale, Michigan, the son of Hedwig (née Anderberg) and James Aage Elcar, a carpenter and butcher. He was an alumnus of the University of Michigan where he was a member of the Alpha Tau Omega fraternity. At age 18, Elcar enlisted and served a tour of duty in the United States Navy at the end of World War II. He moved to New York in the 1950s to become a professional thespian. He was a student of legendary acting coach Sanford Meisner. He brought this education to bear when in 1986, with fellow character actor William Lucking, he formed the Santa Paula Theater Center. Elcar sat as artistic director for six years.

Career

In 1962, he created the role of the hit-man Ben in the U.S. premiere of Harold Pinter's The Dumb Waiter at the Cherry Lane Theater in Greenwich Village, New York City.  That same year he was cast on the long running CBS daytime drama The Guiding Light as Andrew Murray, the District Attorney of Los Angeles County.  Later in 1962 and 1963, due to his stint on The Guiding Light, he was cast in three episodes of the NBC sitcom Car 54, Where Are You?, and two segments of the ABC crime drama Naked City, both set in New York City. In 1966 and 1967, Elcar played Sheriff George Patterson on the gothic soap opera Dark Shadows. He played Inspector Shiller, the supervisor, in the crime drama, Baretta, starring Robert Blake. As a character actor, Elcar guest-starred in many television shows, including Gunsmoke, Mannix, Ironside, Columbo, Cannon, Benson, Newhart, The Fall Guy, Scarecrow and Mrs. King, Hill Street Blues, The A-Team, Trapper John, M.D., Matlock, Law and Order, and ER.

Elcar guest starred on Get Smart, CBS's Mission: Impossible and Storefront Lawyers in 1970. In 1971, he was a guest star on Ironside. He appeared on The Waltons and Kung Fu in 1973. He had a regular role as Colonel Lard in the 1976–78 television military drama, Baa Baa Black Sheep, starring Robert Conrad, and also directed four episodes of the series. He appeared in TV disaster movies such as Heatwave! (1974) and Crisis in Mid-Air (1979). He also appeared in The Sting (1973). 

In 1979, he played judges in Centennial and B. J. and the Bear.  In 1980, he was cast in the role of "Chief" in the Get Smart feature film entitled The Nude Bomb (a.k.a. The Return of Maxwell Smart) that was based on the 1960s hit TV series (the role previously played by Edward Platt, who died in 1974). He also co-starred in two episodes of The A-Team in 1984 and 1985. In 1987, he was cast on Matlock.

Elcar and his stunt/photography double Don S. Davis were often mistaken for each other. Elcar appeared in the hit series Knight Rider in the 1983 episode "Merchants of Death"; as a corrupt sheriff in The Incredible Hulk episode "Escape from Los Santos" (1978), in which Banner is headed to Phoenix; and as KAOS Agent Kruger in the 2-part 1969 episode of Get Smart entitled "And Baby Makes Four".

In 1991, Elcar began to develop glaucoma. This condition was written into the MacGyver plotline, beginning with the sixth season seventeenth episode "Blind Faith" and continuing through the remainder of that season and the entire seventh season, with Elcar's character developing the disease.  The sixth-season finale, "Hind-Sight", was a clip show using Pete Thornton's upcoming eye surgery as a framing device. After MacGyver, Elcar made a guest appearance in "Virus", a 1993 episode of Law & Order, in which he played a man who blamed his diabetes-caused blindness on his former physician, and whose son murdered other patients as revenge.

Elcar also played a blind character on episodes of The Magic School Bus and ER. Once blind, Elcar took on the challenge of playing Vladimir in Waiting for Godot complete with white cane. This was his theatrical swan song, and he retired in 2002 after his ER performance.

Personal life
Elcar married Katherine Frances Mead in 1948 and divorced her in 1950. He married Peggy Romano in 1954 and divorced her in 1970. Elcar had 4 children: Marin Elcar, Nora Elcar Verdon, Dane Elcar, and Chandra Elcar. His long-time partner was Thelma Garcia.

Death
On June 6, 2005, Elcar died at the Community Memorial Hospital in Ventura, California from pneumonia at age 77.

Filmography

Film

Television

References

External links
 
 
 
 Dana Elcar at TV.com
 In Memory of Dana Elcar

1927 births
2005 deaths
Male actors from Michigan
American male film actors
American male stage actors
American male television actors
Blind actors
American blind people
Deaths from pneumonia in California
People from Ferndale, Michigan
People from Santa Paula, California
University of Michigan alumni
20th-century American male actors